The Canadian Joint Operations Command (CJOC) is one of the two unified commands of the Canadian Armed Forces, the other one being the Canadian Special Operations Forces Command. CJOC was announced in May 2012 as the result of the cost-cutting measures in the 2012 federal budget through the merger of Canada Command, the Canadian Expeditionary Force Command and the Canadian Operational Support Command under an integrated command-and-control structure. The command was stood up on 5 October 2012 to officially replace the three former organizations.

CJOC's role is to "anticipate and conduct Canadian Forces operations, and develop, generate and integrate joint force capabilities for operations."

Organization
The command team is led by a lieutenant-general or vice-admiral and assisted by three deputy commanders, one for each of the three main components (Continental, Expeditionary, and Support). The team is further supported by a chief of staff and four senior non-commissioned members, an overall command chief warrant/petty officer, and a command chief warrant/petty officer for each component.

The continental component consists of six regional joint task forces (JTF). In five of these JTFs, the commander also commands an army division or a maritime force. The five southern JTFs have no permanent operational units: units and detachments are temporarily assigned to them from the Royal Canadian Navy, Canadian Army and Royal Canadian Air Force according to operational requirements.

On 1 April 2015, 1st Canadian Division was transferred from the Canadian Army to CJOC.

See also

 Military history of Canada

References

External links

Canadian Forces Operational Commands
Military logistics of Canada
Military units and formations established in 2012
2012 establishments in Canada